Kala Cinta Menggoda is a 1997 album by Indonesian singer Chrisye, with arrangement by Erwin Gutawa. It was released by Musica Studios and it also was his 17th album. It received numerous awards, including two Anugerah Musik Indonesia Awards, in 1998; the music video for the title song "Kala Cinta Menggoda" won the Asia Viewer's Choice Award that same year. This album was also recorded by Chrisye prior to his death, 10 years later.

Production
Kala Cinta Menggoda was recorded by Chrisye, with Erwin Gutawa handling the arrangement.

The song "Ketika Tangan dan Kaki Berkata" was based on the Islamic view of the Last Judgment and verse 65 of Surah Ya Sin, which reads:"Today we shall seal the mouths of the infidels, and their hands will speak to us, and their feet will bear witness to what (evils) they used to earn." The lyrics were written by Taufik Ismail after Chrisye asked him to write lyrics to go with a melody he had written. The recording of "Ketika Tangan dan Kaki Berkata", the last song recorded for the album, required numerous takes because Chrisye would break down in tears after singing a couple of lines. Eventually, Chrisye was able to finish one take the day before he left for Australia. He later wrote that it was one of the most important songs he had ever sung, but he could not sing or listen to it again; he called his emotions in the song the most "sincere" he had ever had while singing.

Track listing

Release and reception
Kala Cinta Menggoda was released in November 1997. Two music videos were produced for Kala Cinta Menggoda, for the songs "Untukku" and "Kala Cinta Menggoda". Both explicitly referenced Javanese culture, with young, rich urbanites wearing Javanese-style masks in "Kala Cinta Menggoda" and Javanese wayang kulit and court dancers in "Untukku".

Kala Cinta Menggoda was well-received, leading to Chrisye being voted Indonesia's "Most Wanted Male Singer" of 1998. Chrisye said that he was glad that people still liked his song. The music video for "Kala Cinta Menggoda" won the Asia Viewer's Choice Award in the 1998 MTV Video Music Awards. It also won two prizes at the 1998 Anugerah Musik Indonesia Awards, for Best Album and Best Producer.

Kala Cinta Menggoda has been reissued twice, once as a CD in 2004 and once as part of the Chrisye Masterpiece Trilogy Limited Edition in 2007. Kala Cinta Menggoda was also the album that Chrisye recorded and released before his death from lung cancer, ten years later.

References
Footnotes

Bibliography
 
 
 

1997 albums
Chrisye albums
Indonesian-language albums